Rivalensundet is a strait in the Svalbard archipelago, separating Kongsøya from Svenskøya both in Kong Karls Land. It has a width of about 14 nautical miles. According to historical records, the strait was discovered in 1859, and first sailed in 1889. It is named after the vessel Rivalen.

References

Straits of Svalbard
Kongsøya
Svenskøya